Walid Azaïez (born 25 April 1976) is a Tunisian footballer. He played in 17 matches for the Tunisia national football team from 1999 to 2002. He was also named in Tunisia's squad for the 2000 African Cup of Nations tournament.

References

1976 births
Living people
Tunisian footballers
Tunisia international footballers
2000 African Cup of Nations players
Association football defenders
CS Hammam-Lif players
Espérance Sportive de Tunis players
Khaleej FC players
Al Salmiya SC players
Stade Gabèsien players
Tunisian expatriate footballers
Expatriate footballers in Saudi Arabia
Expatriate footballers in the United Arab Emirates